The Lancashire and Yorkshire Railway (L&YR) had the largest fleet of all the pre-grouping railway companies.  In 1902 the assets of the Drogheda Steam Packet Company were acquired for the sum of £80,000. In 1905 they took over the Goole Steam Shipping Company.  By 1913 they owned 26 vessels, with another two under construction, plus a further five under joint ownership with the London and North Western Railway.  The L&YR ran steamers between Liverpool and Drogheda, Hull and Zeebrugge, and between Goole and many continental ports including Amsterdam, Copenhagen, Hamburg, and Rotterdam.  The jointly owned vessels provided services between Fleetwood, Belfast and Derry.

The ships operated by the L&YR were:

Ships jointly operated with the London and North Western Railway

References

Bibliography

 

Lancashire and Yorkshire Railway
Defunct shipping companies of the United Kingdom
Shipping companies of England
Transport in Lancashire
Transport in Yorkshire